Karen McMahon is an American lawyer and politician who serves in the New York State Assembly from the 146th district, which represents the village of Williamsville, and the towns of Amherst and Pendleton.

Early career 
McMahon served as a law clerk for state and federal judiciaries for many years.

State Assembly 
McMahon won the November 6, 2018, election for the 146th district of the New York State Assembly, defeating four-term incumbent Republican Ray Walter.

References

External links
New York State Assembly Member Website
Campaign site

Living people
Politicians from Buffalo, New York
Democratic Party members of the New York State Assembly
21st-century American politicians
21st-century American women politicians
Women state legislators in New York (state)
University at Buffalo alumni
1960 births